The 2005 Island Games in Shetland was the 3rd edition in which a women's football (soccer) tournament was played at the multi-games competition. It was contested by six teams in a round-robin format.

The Faroe Islands won the title for the third consecutive time.

Participants

Group phase

Final rankings

See also
Men's Football at the 2005 Island Games

External links
Official 2005 website

2005
Women
Island